Sky Pool is a swimming pool in Houston, Texas, United States. Constructed on top of the Market Square Tower apartment complex, it is billed as the "tallest" pool in Texas. It is supported by two concrete cantilevers, one on each side. The tower and pool, finished in November 2016, were designed by Jackson and Ryan Architects.

References

Swimming pools
Tourist attractions in Houston
Swimming venues in Texas